Jiří Novák and David Rikl were the defending champions but only Rikl competed that year with Nicolás Pereira.

Pereira and Rikl won in the final 6–3, 7–6 against Pablo Campana and Nicolás Lapentti.

Seeds
Champion seeds are indicated in bold text while text in italics indicates the round in which those seeds were eliminated.

 Jose Antonio Conde /  Javier Sánchez (first round)
 Nicolás Pereira /  David Rikl (champions)
 Pablo Albano /  Lucas Arnold (quarterfinals)
 Brent Haygarth /  Greg Van Emburgh (first round)

Draw

References
 1996 Cerveza Club Colombia Open Doubles Draw

Bancolombia Open
1996 ATP Tour